Apibacter mensalis is a bacterium from the genus of Apibacter which has been isolated from the gut of bumblebees (Bombus lapidarius) from Ghent in Belgium.

References

Flavobacteria
Bacteria described in 2016